Agleh Zovihed (also Romanized as ‘Agleh Zovīhed; also known as Algeh Zahad, ‘Eglah Zūyhed-e Pā’īn, Ogleh, Owgleh, Zoḩrīhed ‘Agleh, and Zoḩrīheh-ye ‘Agleh) is a village in Abdoliyeh-ye Sharqi Rural District, in the Central District of Ramshir County, Khuzestan Province, Iran. At the 2006 census, its population was 495, in 90 families.

References 

Populated places in Ramshir County